The golden systomus  (Systomus chryseus) is a species of cyprinid fish endemic to India.  This species can reach a length of  SL. It is a gold colour and has pelvic and anal fins that are orange red.

References 

Systomus
Freshwater fish of India
Fish described in 2014